
AD 91 (XCI) was a common year starting on Saturday (link will display the full calendar) of the Julian calendar. At the time, it was known as the Year of the Consulship of Glabrio and Traianus (or, less frequently, year 844 Ab urbe condita). The denomination AD 91 for this year has been used since the early medieval period, when the Anno Domini calendar era became the prevalent method in Europe for naming years.

Events

By place

Roman Empire 
 Manius Acilius Glabrio and Marcus Ulpius Traianus become Roman Consuls.
 Pliny the Younger is named a tribunus plebis.

Asia 
 The Chinese government reestablishes the Protectorate of the Western Regions.
Chinese government official Ha-li Jako Sin starts his trek to the capital.

By topic

Art and Science 
 Rome is described by Statius in his poems.

Deaths 
 Gaius Vipstanus Apronianus, Roman politician, governor
 Julia Flavia, daughter of Titus, lover of his brother Domitian (b. AD 64)
 Publius Valerius Patruinus, Roman politician, governor

References 

0091

als:90er#Johr 91